WDLM-FM (89.3 FM) is a non-commercial radio station licensed to East Moline, Illinois, United States, and serving the Quad Cities area with a Christian radio format.  The station broadcasts at an Effective Radiated Power of 100 kilowatts.  WDLM-FM's studio is located on E200th Street in rural Henry County, Illinois just outside Coal Valley, co-located with sister station WDLM-AM and its transmitter is located across the Mississippi River at the Bettendorf antenna farm in Bettendorf, Iowa, near the Scott Community College campus, and adjacent to several FM, TV, and DTV transmitters. Both WDLM-FM and WDLM-AM are O&O's of their parent network, the Moody Radio Network, which is owned by the Moody Bible Institute of Chicago.

References

External links
 WDLM Official Website
 

Radio stations in the Quad Cities
Moody Radio
DLM-FM